Flight or Fright is a horror anthology edited by Stephen King and Bev Vincent, published by Cemetery Dance Publications on September 4, 2018. All of the stories within the anthology are about flight-based horrors.

The audiobook of Flight or Fright was released on September 4, 2018, by Simon & Schuster Audio. It is narrated by Stephen King, Bev Vincent, Norbert Leo Butz, Christian Coulson, Santino Fontana, Simon Jones, Graeme Malcolm, Elizabeth Marvel, David Morse, and Corey Stoll.

Background 
At a dinner with friends, before a screening of The Dark Tower in Bangor, Maine, Stephen King brought up how much he hated flying. This sparked a conversation about various stories on the fear of flying, and other horrors that can happen in flight. King said "there [has] never been a collection of flight-based horror stories [...] someone ought to do the book", to which Richard Chizmar responded "I would, in a heartbeat." This discussion prompted King and Bev Vincent to collect and edit Flight or Fright, with Chizmar publishing it under Cemetery Dance Publications.

Stories

Reception 
Publishers Weekly called Flight or Fright "a strong anthology full of satisfying tales", saying it "will have the reader thinking twice about flying." Becky Spratford of Booklist said, "Whether readers take it to the airport or read it with feet firmly planted on the ground, Flight or Fright delivers on its promised theme and will make the next plane ride a little more exciting."

See also 
 Stephen King bibliography
 Stephen King short fiction bibliography

References

External links 
 Flight or Fright at Cemetery Dance Publications
 Flight or Fright at Internet Speculative Fiction Database

2018 anthologies
American anthologies
Horror anthologies
Nightmares in fiction
Short stories about aviation
Books by Stephen King
Cemetery Dance Publications books